Tricky Business is a British children's sitcom which ran for three series from 1989 to 1991. It featured Anthony Davis and Sally Ann Marsh and Una Stubbs in the first series, David Wood, Anthony Davis, Patsy Palmer and a puppet rabbit called Crabtree, performed by Marcus Clarke and made by Hands Up Puppets, in the second and Bernie Clifton and Leslie Schofield in the third. Paul Zenon was the longest-surviving cast member, playing Tricky Micky in series two and himself in series three, as well as being the magic consultant for both those series.

Cast
Anthony Davis
Sally Ann Marsh
Una Stubbs
Patsy Palmer
Bernie Clifton
Paul Zenon
Marcus Clarke

References

External links

1989 British television series debuts
1991 British television series endings
1980s British children's television series
1990s British children's television series
BBC children's television shows
British television shows featuring puppetry
British television magic series
English-language television shows